Ragnar Jóhannsson (born 24 October 1990) is an Icelandic handball player for Selfoss.

Club career
Ragnar Jóhannsson made his debut for his boyhood club Selfoss in the 2005/2006 season, when he was only 15 years old.

International career
Ragnar Jóhannsson is on the Icelandic international team. He made his debut in a friendly against Norway on April 5, 2018.

References

External links

1990 births
Living people
Ragnar Jóhannson
UMF Selfoss handball players
Bergischer HC players